Philip Isdor Mpango (born 14 July 1957) is a Tanzanian economist and politician who serves as the Vice-President of the United Republic of Tanzania. He was sworn into office on 31 March 2021, following unanimous consent of the Tanzanian Parliament, and having been nominated by President Samia Suluhu on 30 March 2021. Before that, he served as the Minister of Finance and Planning in the Tanzanian Cabinet, from March 2015 until 30 March 2021.

Early life and education 
Mpango was born on 14 July 1957 in Tanzania's Kigoma Region. After attending primary and middle school locally, he transferred to Ihungo High School in Bukoba, where he completed his A-Level education, graduating with the equivalent of a high school diploma.

Mpango studied at the University of Dar es Salaam, earning a Bachelor of Arts degree, a Master of Arts degree, and a Doctor of Philosophy degree, all in Economics. He did some of his PhD course work at Lund University in Sweden.

Early career 
Mpango previously held positions as the acting commissioner general of the Tanzania Revenue Authority (TRA), the executive secretary in the President's Office (Planning Commission), the deputy permanent secretary at the Ministry of Finance & Economic Affairs, the personal assistant to the president (economic affairs), the head of the President's Economic Advisory Unit, and as a senior economist for the World Bank.

Political career 
Mpango was nominated by president John Magufuli to serve as a member of the Tanzanian parliament.  The constitution allows the president to nominate up to ten members of parliament.

On 23 December 2015, President John Magufuli appointed Mpango as Minister of Finance and Planning.  In 2020, Magufuli reappointed him to the office. Mpango has been credited with improving the Tanzanian economy by an average of 6 to 7 percent during his five years as finance minister.

During the coronavirus pandemic, after Seif Sharif Hamad, First Vice President of the semi-autonomous region of Zanzibar, had died after contracting the virus,
 and after President Magufuli had admitted that Tanzania had a coronavirus problem, Mpango "appeared coughing and gasping at a press conference" that was held to address rumors that he had died of the coronavirus, shocking many and drawing widespread condemnation.

President Magufuli's subsequent death was announced on 17 March 2021, resulting in Vice-President Samia Suluhu being sworn in as his successor on 19 March 2021, and her nomination on 30 March 2021 of Mpango to the vice-presidential office that she had vacated.

At the time he was confirmed for the position of vice-president, in March 2021, he was the incumbent MP for the constituency of Buhigwe in Kigoma Region of northwest Tanzania.  According to the laws of the country, once he was appointed VP, he ceased to be an MP and his parliamentary seat fell vacant.  Mpango has stated that he planned to combat corruption and continue implementing major infrastructure projects, including a new standard gauge railway.

Other activities
 African Development Bank (AfDB), Ex-Officio Member of the Board of Governors (2015–2021)

Notes

References

External links 
 Dr Phillip Mpango: Biography of Tanzania Vice President wey President Samia Suluhu name afta John Magufuli death As of 30 March 2021 (In Pidgin).

1957 births
Living people
Chama Cha Mapinduzi MPs
Finance Ministers of Tanzania
Tanzanian MPs 2015–2020
Nominated Tanzanian MPs
Tanzanian economists
University of Dar es Salaam alumni
People from Kigoma Region
Vice-presidents of Tanzania
20th-century economists
21st-century economists